The 1887 North Longford by-election was a parliamentary by-election held for the United Kingdom House of Commons constituency of North Longford on 5 February 1887. The sitting member, Justin McCarthy of the Irish Parliamentary Party had been re-elected in the general election of 1886, but having been elected also in the constituency of Londonderry City, he chose to sit for the latter on the basis that the Longford seat was safe for a Nationalist candidate. In the ensuing by-election another Irish Parliamentary Party candidate, Tim Healy, former member for North Monaghan, was elected unopposed.

References

1887 elections in the United Kingdom
February 1887 events
By-elections to the Parliament of the United Kingdom in County Longford constituencies
Unopposed by-elections to the Parliament of the United Kingdom in Irish constituencies
1887 elections in Ireland